Colin Lawrence Carige (19 July 1938 – 15 May 2002), Australian politician, was a member of the Australian House of Representatives from 1975 to 1977, representing the Division of Capricornia. He held the seat for the National Country Party.

Carige was born in Mount Morgan. His livelihood was earned in small business, having variously owned a restaurant, a cattle grazing property, and a construction business.

Colin Carige married his wife Gloria Carige [nee Hardy] and had three children. Julie, Lawrence and Susan. He was grandfather to four grandchildren. Daniel, Erin and Anna who were born to Julie and Jillian who was born to Lawrence.

Carige died of acute myeloid leukemia in May 2002.

In Parliament on 24 June 2002, Senator Ron Boswell alluded to his country upbringing in his speech of condolence:

References
 Hansard, Parliament of Australia, 24/6/2002, page 2488

1938 births
2002 deaths
National Party of Australia members of the Parliament of Australia
Members of the Australian House of Representatives for Capricornia
Members of the Australian House of Representatives
People from Biloela
20th-century Australian politicians
Deaths from acute myeloid leukemia
Deaths from cancer in Queensland